Henry Frazier Robinson (May 30, 1910 – October 13, 1997), nicknamed "Slow", was an American Negro league catcher for the Kansas City Monarchs, New York Black Yankees, and Baltimore Elite Giants between 1942 and 1950.

A native of Birmingham, Alabama, Robinson was the brother of fellow Negro leaguer Norman Robinson, and served in the US Navy during World War II. Robinson died in Kings Mountain, North Carolina in 1997 at age 87.

References

External links
 and Seamheads
 Henry Robinson at Negro Leagues Baseball Museum

1910 births
1997 deaths
Baltimore Elite Giants players
Kansas City Monarchs players
New York Black Yankees players
United States Navy personnel of World War II
United States Navy sailors
20th-century African-American sportspeople
Baseball catchers
African-American United States Navy personnel
African Americans in World War II